Kolaghat Thermal Power Station is a major thermal power station in West Bengal. It is located at Mecheda, approx. 55 km from Kolkata in the Purba Medinipur district. The power plant is operated by West Bengal Power Development Corporation Limited(WBPDCL)

The power plant has six units of 210 MW, each for a total capacity of 1260 MW. The units were commissioned in two stages during the period of 1984 to 1995.

Installed capacity
Following is the unit wise capacity of the plant.

See also 

 Kolaghat
 Bakreshwar Thermal Power Station
 Santaldih Thermal Power Station

References 

2.

WBPDCL

Coal-fired power stations in West Bengal
Purba Medinipur district
Energy infrastructure completed in 1990
1990 establishments in West Bengal
20th-century architecture in India